Jakov Medić (born 7 September 1998) is a Croatian professional footballer who plays as a defensive midfielder or centre-back for FC St. Pauli.

Career
Born in Zagreb, Medić started his career in local clubs Kustošija and HAŠK, before moving on to play in top-tier U17 and U19 Croatian competitions for Hrvatski Dragovoljac and NK Zagreb, before going on trial and signing for Istra 1961 during his last year of eligibility as a youth player. In the Pula-based club, Medić made his senior debut in the Prva HNL coming on for David Puclin in for David Puclin in the 58th minute of their 2–0 away loss to Slaven Belupo. Medić was capped only once more for the team, before leaving the club in the summer of 2017.

Initially signing for Lučko in the Druga HNL and playing a single match for them, Medić moved on in August 2017 to the high-flying third-tier club NK Vinogradar. During the winter pause Medić went on a trial with Dinamo Minsk, which did not pan out, and the player missed the second half of the season. 

In the summer of 2019, however, Medić made a move abroad, signing for 1. FC Nürnberg, playing for their fourth-tier reserves. In 2019, he moved on a two-year loan to the 2. Bundesliga team SV Wehen Wiesbaden. Relegated with the team, Medić remained with Wehen despite the club's relegation to 3. Liga, and, becoming a key player for the team, the club made his move permanent, signing him on a contract until 2024.

In June 2021, FC St. Pauli announced Medić would join the club for the 2021–22 season.

References

External links
 

1998 births
Living people
Footballers from Zagreb
Association football central defenders
Croatian footballers
NK Istra players
NK Lučko players
NK Vinogradar players
1. FC Nürnberg II players
1. FC Nürnberg players
SV Wehen Wiesbaden players
FC St. Pauli players
2. Bundesliga players
3. Liga players
Croatian Football League players
First Football League (Croatia) players
Regionalliga players
Croatian expatriate footballers
Expatriate footballers in Germany
Croatian expatriate sportspeople in Germany